DXYZ (107.1 FM), broadcasting as 107.1 Love Radio, is a radio station owned and operated by Manila Broadcasting Company. The station's studio and transmitter are located at Room 303, Marietta Tower, Quezon Ave., Brgy. Poblacion, Iligan.

Last April 20, 2017, Love Radio was shut down by Iligan mayor Celso Regencia due to failure of former management to paying taxes. The station returned on the air under new management weeks later. It went off the air sometime in 2021.

References

Radio stations in Iligan
Radio stations established in 1995